Independence School Local 1 is a public charter high school in Baltimore, Maryland, United States. It is a part of the "small-schools" initiative to consolidate large school sizes into smaller learning environments.

References

External links
 Independence School Local 1 Website
 Independence School Local 1 - Maryland Report Card

Public schools in Baltimore
Public high schools in Maryland
Charter schools in Maryland
Hampden, Baltimore